Taekwondo took place from October 8 to October 9 at the 1994 Asian Games in Aki Ward Sports Center, Hiroshima, Japan. Men's competitions held in eight weight categories for each. Each country was limited to having 4 athletes for the entire competition. South Korea topped the medal table by winning all four possible gold medals

Medalists

Medal table

References
 WTF Hall of Fame

External links
 Results

 
1994 Asian Games events
1994
Asian Games
1994 Asian Games